The 2004 Libyan Super Cup was the 8th edition of the Super Cup, and was played on Friday, August 27, 2004 between LPL winners Al Olympic and Libyan Cup winners Al Ittihad. Al Olympic ended the game with 9 men, Nader Kara and Younes Al Shibani having both been sent off, Kara going for taking his shirt off after scoring, and Al Shibani walking for a poor tackle. Al Ittihad comfortably won the game 5-2.

Match details

References

Libyan Super Cup
2004–05 in Libyan football